KPMO (1300 AM) is a radio station licensed to Mendocino, California. The station is owned by Southern Oregon University, and is an affiliate of Jefferson Public Radio, airing JPR's "News & Information" service, consisting of news and talk programming.

References

External links
ijpr.org

PMO
NPR member stations
Southern Oregon University
Radio stations established in 1967
1967 establishments in California